Departments form the second level of administrative division (below the provinces), and are subdivided in municipalities. They are extended in all of Argentina except for the Province of Buenos Aires and the Autonomous City of Buenos Aires, the national capital, each of which has different administrative arrangements (respectively partidos and comunas).

Except in La Rioja, Mendoza, and San Juan Provinces, departments have no executive authorities or assemblies of their own. However, they serve as territorial constituencies for the election of members of the legislative bodies of most provinces. For example, in Santa Fe Province, each department returns one senator to the provincial senate. In Tucumán Province, on the other hand, where legislators are elected by zone (Capital, East, West) the departments serve only as districts for the organization of certain civil agencies, such as the police or the health system.

There are 377 departments in all, not including the two "nominal" departments composed of internationally disputed territory in Tierra del Fuego Province: Antártida Argentina, and Islas del Atlántico Sur (which includes the Falkland Islands and South Georgia and the South Sandwich Islands). Of the department names, 31 are not unique within Argentina, with the result that 90 departments have identically or similarly named counterparts in one or more other Argentine province.

List of departments

Departments with the same or similar names 
Some departments have similar names

Referring to Manuel Belgrano in some form 7x
 Belgrano Department: 3x
 Doctor Manuel Belgrano Department, Jujuy
 General Belgrano Department: 2x
 General Manuel Belgrano Department, Misiones
Referring to José de San Martín 10x
 General San Martín Department: 2x
 Libertador General San Martín Department: 3x
 San Martín Department:  5x

Departments in different provinces having the same name
 
 Avellaneda Department
 Avellaneda Department, Río Negro
 Avellaneda Department, Santiago del Estero
 Belgrano Department
 Belgrano Department, San Luis
 Belgrano Department, Santa Fe
 Belgrano Department, Santiago del Estero
 Bermejo Department
 Bermejo Department, Chaco
 Bermejo Department, Formosa
 Capital 11x
 Chacabuco Department
 Chacabuco Department, Chaco
 Chacabuco Department, San Luis
 Colón Department
 Colón Department, Entre Ríos
 Colón Department, Córdoba
 General Alvear Department
 General Alvear Department, Corrientes
 General Alvear Department, Mendoza
 General Belgrano Department
 General Belgrano Department, Chaco
 General Belgrano Department, La Rioja
 General Güemes Department
 General Güemes Department, Chaco
 General Güemes Department, Salta
 General Roca Department
 General Roca Department, Córdoba
 General Roca Department, Río Negro
 General San Martín Department
 General San Martín Department, Córdoba
 General San Martín Department, Salta
 General San Martín Department, La Rioja
 Independencia Department
 Independencia Department, Chaco
 Independencia Department, La Rioja
 Junín Department
 Junín Department, Mendoza
 Junín Department, San Luis
 La Paz Department
 La Paz Department, Catamarca
 La Paz Department, Entre Ríos
 La Paz Department, Mendoza
 Lavalle Department
 Lavalle Department, Corrientes
 Lavalle Department, Mendoza
 Libertador General San Martín Department
 Libertador General San Martín Department, Misiones
 Libertador General San Martín Department, Chaco
 Libertador General San Martín Department, San Luis
 Maipú Department
 Maipú Department, Chaco
 Maipú Department, Mendoza
 Minas Department
 Minas Department, Córdoba
 Minas Department, Neuquén
 Nueve de Julio Department
 Nueve de Julio Department, Chaco
 Nueve de Julio Department, Río Negro
 Nueve de Julio Department, San Juan
 Nueve de Julio Department, Santa Fe
 Rawson Department
 Rawson Department, Chubut
 Rawson Department, San Juan
 Río Chico Department
 Río Chico Department, Tucumán
 Río Chico Department, Santa Cruz
 Rivadavia Department
 Rivadavia Department, Mendoza
 Rivadavia Department, Salta
 Rivadavia Department, San Juan
 Rivadavia Department, Santiago del Estero
 San Antonio Department
 San Antonio Department, Jujuy
 San Antonio Department, Río Negro
 San Carlos Department
 San Carlos Department, Mendoza
 San Carlos Department, Salta
 San Javier Department
 San Javier Department, Córdoba
 San Javier Department, Misiones
 San Javier Department, Santa Fe
 San Justo Department
 San Justo Department, Córdoba
 San Justo Department, Santa Fe
 San Martín Department
 San Martín Department, Corrientes
 San Martín Department, Mendoza
 San Martín Department, San Juan
 San Martín Department, Santiago del Estero
 San Martín Department, Santa Fe
 San Pedro Department
 San Pedro Department, Jujuy
 San Pedro Department, Misiones
 Santa Rosa Department
 Santa Rosa Department, Catamarca
 Santa Rosa Department, Mendoza
 Sarmiento Department
 Sarmiento Department, Chubut
 Sarmiento Department, San Juan
 Sarmiento Department, Santiago del Estero
 Veinticinco de Mayo Department
 Veinticinco de Mayo Department, Chaco
 Veinticinco de Mayo Department, Misiones
 Veinticinco de Mayo Department, Río Negro
 Veinticinco de Mayo Department, San Juan

See also
 For a list of partidos in the province of Buenos Aires, see Partidos of Buenos Aires
 For a list of comunas in the city of Buenos Aires, see Communes of Buenos Aires

 
Subdivisions of Argentina
Departments
Departments, Argentina
Departments